Dipper Dredge No. 3 is a historic dredge located at Lyons in Wayne County, New York.  It is a steam-powered floating dredge located at the dry dock of the New York State Barge Canal at Lyons.  The dredge consists of a rectangular riveted steel hull built in 1929 and measuring 110 feet in length, 34 feet in beam, and 7 feet in draft.  The bow of the hull is squared and vertical.  The stern is squared but inclined in the manner of a scow.  In 1946, fuel bunkers were added to the sides of the hull.  Much of the machinery, including the steam engines, was built in 1909.

It was listed on the National Register of Historic Places in 2007.

References

Industrial equipment on the National Register of Historic Places
Ships on the National Register of Historic Places in New York (state)
1929 ships
Buildings and structures in Wayne County, New York
National Register of Historic Places in Wayne County, New York
Dredgers